Mesognathariidae is a family of worms belonging to the order Bursovaginoidea.

Genera:
 Labidognathia Riedl, 1970
 Mesognatharia Sterrer, 1966
 Tenuignathia Sterrer, 1976

References

Gnathostomulida
Platyzoa families